Ernie Lancaster (November 30, 1953 – July 17, 2014) was an American electric blues and blues rock guitarist and songwriter.  He released two solo albums. Lancaster had the ability to vary his style between strict blues, and rock, jazz, soul and pop.

He cited his influences as Roy Buchanan, Stevie Ray Vaughan and John Lee Hooker.

Life and career
Ernest Ray Lancaster was born in Georgia, United States. He later grew up in South Carolina before relocating with his family to Mount Dora, Florida.  He formed his own band while at school, which eventually played at Stetson University and on television in Orlando.  After dropping out of college, and getting married at age 19, 
he was a founding member of the Sex Change Band in the mid-1970s. As the backing outfit for Root Boy Slim, the band was a fixture in the mid-Atlantic blues and rock scene, and favored a mix of Memphis-style boogie rock/blues. They recorded an album for Warner Bros. Records in 1978, their first of six records. In 1989, Lancaster played on the Pee Wee, Fred and Maceo album recorded by the JB Horns.

Lancaster's guitar work appeared on numerous albums in the 1980s and 1990s, before he released his debut solo album.  That was Ernestly, an all instrumental affair, which was released on Ichiban Records in 1991. Other musicians Lancaster supplied guitar playing for included Rufus Thomas, Reverend Billy C. Wirtz, Kenny Neal, Noble Watts and Lucky Peterson.  The latter musician was heavily involved in playing the Hammond organ on Lancaster's first album, with a co-starring credit noted on the album's sleeve.  The Allmusic journalist, Alex Henderson, noted that "Although not stunning, Ernestly provides some gritty and unpretentious fun."

In 1993, Lancaster played guitar in James Brown's backing band, during their European tour.

Lancaster's second album, Lightnin' Alley, which comprised self composed tracks (in a similar vein to his first album) was issued in May 2008.  He also appeared at the Boundary Waters Blues Festival.

Lancaster died from pancreatic cancer, at his home in Mount Dora, Florida in July 2014, aged 60.

Discography

See also
List of electric blues musicians
List of soul-blues musicians

References

External links
Official website
Discogs.com

1953 births
2014 deaths
American blues guitarists
Electric blues musicians
American rhythm and blues guitarists
American male guitarists
Guitarists from Georgia (U.S. state)
Songwriters from Georgia (U.S. state)
Guitarists from Florida
Songwriters from Florida
Deaths from cancer in Florida
Deaths from pancreatic cancer
20th-century American guitarists
20th-century American male musicians
American male songwriters